Major general (Maj Gen) is a "two-star" rank in the British Army and Royal Marines. The rank was also briefly used by the Royal Air Force for a year and a half, from its creation to August 1919. In the British Army, a major general is the customary rank for the appointment of division commander. In the Royal Marines, the rank of major general is held by the Commandant General.

A Major General is senior to a Brigadier but subordinate to lieutenant general. The rank is OF-7 on the NATO rank scale, equivalent to a rear admiral in the Royal Navy or an air vice-marshal in the Royal Air Force and the air forces of many Commonwealth countries.

The rank insignia is the star (or 'pip') of the Order of the Bath, over a crossed sword and baton.

In terms of orthography, compound ranks were invariably hyphenated, prior to about 1980. Nowadays the rank is almost equally invariably non-hyphenated. When written as a title, especially before a person's name, both words of the rank are always capitalised, whether using the "traditional" hyphenated style of, say, the two World Wars, or the modern un-hyphenated style.  When used as common nouns, they might be written in lower-case: "Major General Montgomery was one of several major generals to be promoted at this time."

British Army usage
In the British Army, a division is commanded by a major general. However, other appointments may also be held by major generals. For example, the Commandant of the Royal Military Academy Sandhurst is a major general.

Until around the 1980s, the heads of each branch of service, such as the Royal Armoured Corps, the Royal Artillery and the Corps of Infantry, were major generals. Other, administrative, commands were also appointments for a major general. In addition, the senior officer of the Royal Army Chaplains' Department, the Chaplain-General, is accorded 'the relative precedence' - that is to say the equivalence rather than the full powers and authority - of the rank of major general.

Royal Marines usage
The Commandant General Royal Marines has held the rank of major general since 1996, when the post was downgraded from lieutenant general.  As in the British Army, a Royal Marines major general ranks below lieutenant general and above brigadier.

Royal Air Force usage
From its foundation on 1 April 1918 to 31 July 1919, the Royal Air Force briefly used the rank of major-general. The service was a wartime amalgamation of the Army's Royal Flying Corps and the Navy's Royal Naval Air Service, so the ranks were a compromise between these two traditions. The insignia of the rank was derived from that of a Royal Navy rear-admiral and featured a broad gold stripe on the cuff below one narrow gold stripe. The two stripes were surmounted by an eagle (volant and affronty) under a king's crown. The RAF replaced the rank of major-general with the rank of air vice-marshal on 1 August 1919.

Despite the short duration, the significance of the RAF to modern warfare was indicated by the number of senior officers who did hold the rank of major-general in the RAF:
Edward Ashmore
Sefton Brancker
George Cayley
Edward Ellington
Philip Game
The Honorable Sir Frederick Gordon
Frederick Heath-Caldwell
John Higgins
Mark Kerr
Charles Lambe
Charles Longcroft
Godfrey Paine
Geoffrey Salmond
John Salmond
Ernest Swinton
Frederick Sykes
Hugh Trenchard

See also

British and U.S. military ranks compared
British Army Other Ranks rank insignia
British Army officer rank insignia

Notes

References

External links 
 British Army Website

 British Army Ranks

Military ranks of the British Army
Military ranks of the Royal Marines
Former military ranks of the Royal Air Force